The 1976 Denver Broncos season was the team's 17th year in professional football and its seventh with the National Football League (NFL). The team finished the season with a winning record for the third time in the last four seasons. It was John Ralston's fifth and final season as the Broncos' head coach and general manager.

Denver was looking to improve on its 6–8 record from 1975 and finished 9–5, second in the AFC West; despite the winning record, the team again missed the playoffs, which included only eight teams. Oakland won the division at 13–1 and New England was the sole wild card team in the AFC at 11–3. Since their inception as an original AFL team in 1960, the Broncos had yet to play in the postseason.

Ralston was relieved of his duties as general manager in mid-December, succeeded by assistant GM Fred Gehrke. After several weeks in the restructured organization, Ralston resigned as head coach in late January 1977. Red Miller, the offensive line coach at New England under Chuck Fairbanks, was hired as head coach in early February. Miller had a previous stint with the Broncos as offensive line coach for three seasons (1963–65).

Offseason

NFL Draft

Personnel

Staff

Roster

Schedule

Standings

References

External links
Denver Broncos – 1976 media guide
 1976 Denver Broncos on Pro-Football-Reference.com

Denver Broncos
Denver Broncos seasons
Denver Broncos